Trinity Christian Academy (TCA) is a private, non-denominational Christian school ministry of Trinity Assembly of God church. It enrolls students from grades K-2 (preschool) to 12th grade. TCA is located in Deltona, Florida.

Trinity's baseball team won the state championship in 2009, 2010 and 2012.  A former Eagle, Andrew Brown, was a pitcher in the MLB.

Alumni 
 Paxton Lynch, quarterback, selected in the first round of the 2016 NFL Draft by the Denver Broncos.
 Derek West, baseball player

References

External links 
 School website

Christian schools in Florida
1986 establishments in Florida
Private elementary schools in Florida
High schools in Volusia County, Florida
Private middle schools in Florida
Private high schools in Florida
Deltona, Florida

Educational institutions established in 1986